Scott Sibley (born 1973) is an American politician, businessman and philanthropist.

Early life
Scott Sibley was born in California. He received his B.S. in Business Administration, Real Estate from the University of Nevada, Las Vegas. Afterwards he completed certification as both a licensed process server and licensed real estate broker.

Business career
Sibley was a pressman with the Nevada Legal News owned by Uncle Hoyt beginning in 1993, and continued on until Hoyt's death in 1997 when Scott took over as editor and publisher of the newspaper. His strong real estate background, involvement with sales at the County Courthouse, and experience as a licensed process server, has made him one of the foremost experts on nonjudicial foreclosure law in Nevada. He later became the managing partner of Nevada Holistic Medicine. Scott's ability to manage complex business challenges, make high-stake decisions and successfully drive growth has played a key factor in his success. Scott has been a licensed real estate broker and real estate agent for 15 years. He has been involved in many challenging real estate transactions. In the last several years, Scott has acquired various forms of distressed debt and has been very successful at reorganizing, stabilizing and disposing of these assets. In 2017 Sibley became a partner with MMJ America, a marijuana cultivation and dispensary company. Under a joint-venture arrangement, Sibley's group owns the Vegas dispensary and MMJ runs it (along with two cultivation facilities coming online soon) for a percentage of the profits.

Political career

From 2004 to 2005, Sibley served in the Nevada State Assembly, representing District No. 22 of Clark County, being elected as a Republican with 55.68% of the vote. During his tenure he co-sponsored Assembly Bill 182, which allowed students to administer their own asthma medication as school. He also introduced a bill to require all public land in Nevada to be sold by auction if put up for sale. From 2010 to 2013, Sibley was a member of the Commission for Common-Interest Communities and Condominium Hotels of the State of Nevada, a position to which he was again appointed in 2016. He later also sat on the Green Ribbon Commission for marijuana business advisory as an at-large member in 2017. The panel will set policies regarding land use and licensing of retail marijuana establishments and recommend proposed changes to zoning and business license codes.

Philanthropy 

Scott founded the Sibley Family Foundation in 2008 and has donated over $2.5 million to help serve Nevada and the Las Vegas community. The mission of the foundation is to call attention to, and fund the development of new research, treatments and medications addressing Alzheimer's disease; and to help support medical and educational initiatives and research of Alzheimer's disease, its treatment, and cure. The foundation has contributed to numerous organizations including the Clippers Foundation, UNLVINO, Power of Love, Keep Memory Alive, UNLV Foundation, Cleveland Clinic, One Drop and SafeNet.

Sibley is also a member of the 1921 Society of the Cleveland Clinic, which honors those who have made donations of over $1,000,000.

References

1973 births
Living people
Members of the Nevada Assembly
University of Nevada, Las Vegas alumni
American legal writers
20th-century American newspaper publishers (people)
21st-century American newspaper publishers (people)